Dang Show is a Persian music band formed in 2007 by two brothers: Taha Parsa, and Shaya Shoja. According to Taha Parsa, they consider their genre to be called “New Age Folklore”. The name “Dang Show” stems in a poem by Mowlana and means “give up your wisdom, according to the band members.

The iranian band Dang Show could be defined as "a fusion of Persian classical and jazz.”. In 2018 it was awarded Best Fusion Album for Mad O Nay in Iran.

Instruments 
Instruments such as saxophone, Tonbak (Persian instrument), piano, cello, and bass are often used in their music.

Performances 
Since 2007 they have had numerous performances in Iran, United States, Canada, United Kingdom, Thailand, and Bosnia and Herzegovina.
Recent performances are Based on Toronto, Canada.
Dang show started having the first woman vocal artist in their shows and performances, Mahnaz Rad since 2019.

Members 
Since 2007, Taha Parsa (vocal and saxophone), Reza Shaya (piano), and Saba Samimi (tonbak) have been the permanent members. Other temporary members include Sepanta Mojtahedzadeh (vocal), Omid Nemati (vocal), Ali Zand Vakili (vocal), Milad Bagheri (vocal), Mahnaz Rad (Vocal), Khashayar Ravangar (drums), Aidin Tarkian (kamancheh), Kasra Saboktakin (bass), Makan Khoinejad (cello), and so on.

Albums 
 40 Year Old Shiraz (2010)
 Deltang Show (2013)
 Dang Show Room (2014)
 Mad o Nay (2017)
 Shiraz (2019)

References

Musical groups established in 2007
Iranian music